The Sony E 30mm F3.5 Macro is an APS-C macro prime lens for the Sony E-mount, announced by Sony on June 8, 2011.

Build quality
The lens features a plastic exterior with a silver finish and a pancake-style lens hood. As of June 2017, the 30mm Macro lens is one of only 3 E-mount lens manufactured by Sony that are specifically designed for macro photography, with the others being the Sony FE 50mm F2.8 Macro and Sony FE 90mm F2.8 Macro G OSS lenses.

Image quality
Sharpness is fair, appearing softer around the outer edges of the frame when at F3.5 (which sharpens up when stopped down to f/8.0). The lens also suffers from moderate vignetting and chromatic aberration.

See also
List of Sony E-mount lenses
Sony FE 50mm F2.8 Macro
Zeiss Touit 2.8/50mm Macro

References

Camera lenses introduced in 2011
35
Macro lenses